Jay Hoffman may refer to:
 Jay Hoffman (politician) (born 1961), member of the Illinois House of Representatives
Jay Hoffman (rugby league) (born 1958), Australian rugby league footballer
Jay Hoffman (soccer) (born 1951), American soccer player and coach